Manitoba Junior Hockey League (MJHL) commissioner Jimmy Dunn implemented an automatic one-game minimum suspension for any player who received a match penalty as of the 1965–66 season. He felt that professional hockey influenced fisticuffs in junior hockey and said that, "Any time there's a big fight in the National Hockey League, the kids drop their sticks and put up their dukes in the next game. It happens almost every time".

Champion
On March 18, 1966, at the Winnipeg Arena, the Winnipeg Rangers won the Turnbull Memorial Trophy as MJHL champs.

Regular season

Tie Breaker (single game) Braves defeated Monarchs

Playoffs
Semi-Finals
Warriors lost to Braves 3-games-to-2
Turnbull Cup Championship
Rangers defeated Braves 4-games-to-1
Western Memorial Cup Semi-Final
Rangers lost to Fort William Canadiens (TBJHL) 4-games-to-none

Awards

All-Star Teams

References

Manitoba Junior Hockey League
Manitoba Hockey Hall of Fame
Hockey Hall of Fame
Winnipeg Free Press Archives
Brandon Sun Archives

MJHL
Manitoba Junior Hockey League seasons